Hangul Jamo Extended-A is a Unicode block containing choseong (initial consonant) forms of archaic Hangul consonant clusters. They can be used to dynamically compose syllables that are not available as precomposed Hangul syllables in Unicode, specifically syllables that are not used in standard modern Korean.

Block

History
The following Unicode-related documents record the purpose and process of defining specific characters in the Hangul Jamo Extended-A block:

References 

Unicode blocks
Extended-B